Antachara is a genus of moths of the family Noctuidae.

Species
 Antachara denterna (Guenée, 1852)
 Antachara diminuta (Guenée, 1852)
 Antachara mexicana (Hampson, 1909)

References
 Antachara at Markku Savela's Lepidoptera and Some Other Life Forms
 Natural History Museum Lepidoptera genus database

Acronictinae
Noctuoidea genera